Jack Jacobs (August 7, 1919 – January 12, 1974), nicknamed "Indian Jack", was an American and Canadian football player in the National Football League and Western Interprovincial Football Union. He was a charter member of the Canadian Football Hall of Fame, inducted in 1963.

Early life
Jacobs was born in Holdenville, Oklahoma, and played high school football at Muskogee High School. He was popularly known as "Indian Jack" because he was a Creek man.

College career
Jacobs played college football at the University of Oklahoma. Considered a phenomenal all-round player, Jack started at both quarterback and punter, where he averaged 47.84 yards per kick in 1940 (which remains an OU record) and finished his collegiate career with a career average of 42.10. Jacobs accumulated the most offense yardage in 1940/1941 (junior & senior years). As a defensive back, Jacobs is tied with seven other players for the record number of interceptions in a game (3) (1941 OU vs. Marquette).

Professional career

National Football League
Jacobs was drafted in the second round of the 1942 NFL Draft. He played quarterback, defensive back, tailback, halfback, punter in the National Football League with the Cleveland Rams in 1942 and 1945 (serving in the U.S. Army Air Force during World War Two), the Washington Redskins in 1946 and the Green Bay Packers from 1947 to 1949. he led the league in punting in 1947.

Western Interprovincial Football Union
Jacobs then joined the Western Interprovincial Football Union as a quarterback for the Winnipeg Blue Bombers (1950–1954), for whom he won the Jeff Nicklin Memorial Trophy in 1952.  Though Jacobs did not invent the forward pass, he is widely recognized as one of the key figures in making the forward pass an integral part of professional football.  His exciting passing game drew thousands of fans to Blue Bombers games, instigating the need for the city to build a larger stadium, Winnipeg Stadium (later called Canad Inns Stadium).

As a Blue Bomber, Jacobs completed 709 of 1,330 passes for 11,094 yards, at that time the all-time leading passer for the Western Interprovincial Football Union. In 1951, he became the first professional football player to throw for 3,000 yards in a season with 3,248. He was also the first player to throw for more than 30 touchdowns with 33. The next season Jacobs threw 34 touchdowns and amassed 2,586 yards. Jacobs had 104 touchdown passes to only 53 interceptions.

With Jacobs as their starting quarterback, the Bombers compiled a record of 46 wins, 27 losses, and three ties. They lost the Grey Cup in 1950 to the Toronto Argonauts (13-0) and again in 1953 to the Hamilton Tiger-Cats (12-6).

Winnipeg Stadium, built in 1953, was nicknamed "The House That Jack Built" because of Jacobs' contribution to the success of the team.

Jacobs was twice a Grey Cup finalist, was named the all-western quarterback twice, and was one of the original inductees to the Canadian Football Hall of Fame in June 1963. He was also inducted into the American Indian Athletic Hall of Fame in 1977, the Oklahoma Sports Hall of Fame in 2002, and the Manitoba Sports Hall of Fame and Museum in 2004. Several records he set while at the University of Oklahoma still stand.

Other pro football
Jacobs asked for his outright release from the Winnipeg Blue Bombers in February 1956. After being waived out of the WIFU, Jacobs signed a contract with the London Lords (ORFU) as the head coach. Jacobs also played most of the season for the Lords.

In 1957, Jacobs added the role of general manager to his duties with the London Lords. Jacobs played in one exhibition game in 1957.

After serving as an assistant coach in the CFL, Jacobs returned to the field as a player in 1964. Jacobs suited up for the Toledo Tornadoes (United Football League) and saw action primarily as a punter although he did see some action at quarterback as well.

Jacobs put on the pads for one final game on July 18, 1966, dressing for the Winnipeg Blue Bombers in an exhibition game.

Career regular season statistics

Post football
In 1955, Jacobs was a scout for the Winnipeg Blue Bombers and later, was a coach for the London Lords of the Ontario Rugby Football Union (ORFU) for two seasons. He also worked as an assistant coach for the Hamilton Tiger-Cats, Montreal Alouettes and the Edmonton Eskimos.

Jacobs was also an actor who played a professional football player in the 1948 movie, Triple Threat. Jacobs died in 1974 in Greensboro, North Carolina from a sudden heart attack.

References

 Who's Who in Canadian Sport by Bob Ferguson (3rd edition, Sporting Facts Publications, Ottawa, 1999), .
 "CFL Facts, Figures and Records" 1985 to 2007 Canadian Football League

External links
NFL stats
Manitoba Sports Hall of Fame profile

1919 births
1974 deaths
20th-century American male actors
American male film actors
American football quarterbacks
American football defensive backs
American football halfbacks
American football punters
American players of Canadian football
Canadian Football Hall of Fame inductees
Canadian football quarterbacks
Cleveland Rams players
Edmonton Elks coaches
Green Bay Packers players
March Field Flyers football players
Muscogee people
Oklahoma Sooners football players
Ontario Rugby Football Union players
United Football League (1961–1964) players
Washington Redskins players
Winnipeg Blue Bombers players
People from Holdenville, Oklahoma
Players of American football from Oklahoma
Native American male actors
Native American sportspeople
20th-century Native Americans